Nordahl is a Nordic name, thought to be of Swedish or Norwegian origin. Notable people with the name:

Given name
 Nordahl Lelandais (born 1983), French ex-military involved in criminal cases
 Nordahl Brue, American lawyer and entrepreneur 
 Nordahl Grieg, Norwegian poet, novelist, dramatist, and journalist
 Nordahl Rolfsen, Norwegian writer, educationalist and teacher
 Nordahl Wallem, Norwegian sailor who competed in the 1936 Summer Olympics

Surname
 Blane David Nordahl, American burglar 
 Danny Nordahl, American bass guitarist
 Johan Nordahl Brun (1745-1816) Norwegian poet, dramatist, bishop in Bergen
 Thomas Nordahl, (born 1946) Swedish footballer, member of the national team for the 1970 FIFA World Cup, son of Gunnar

Nordahl brothers
Bertil Nordahl, (born 1917, dead 1998) Swedish footballer, Olympic gold medalist in 1948
Knut Nordahl, (born 1920, dead 1984) Swedish footballer, Olympic gold medalist in 1948
Gunnar Nordahl, born 1921, dead 1995) Swedish footballer, Olympic gold medalist in 1948

Swedish-language surnames